This is a list of films which have placed number one at the weekend box office in Lithuania during 2020.

See also
 List of Lithuanian films — Lithuanian films by year

References

External links
 

2020
2020 in Lithuania
Lithuania